Hakob Hovnatanyan (1806–1881) was an Armenian artist. He was a member of the Hovnatanyan family, a miniaturists dynasty from the 17th to the 19th centuries. Hacob Hovantanyan who was also called “The Raphael of Tiflis”, was the founder of the modern Armenian painting school and one of the masters in portraiture, illustration and miniature.

Life 

Hakob Hovnatanyan was the fifth generation from the Hovnatanian family. He succeeded the patriarch of the family Naghash Hovnatan (1661–1722), a famous poet and painter. Naghash lived in Caucasus in the Safavid era. 
Hovnatanyan received his training from Mkrtum Hovnatanyan, his father, and painted the walls of some churches with his father in Armenia and Tiflis in his youth. His widespread fame began when he was awarded the golden medal from Saint Petersburg Art organization in 1841. After that, he was notably considered by Georgian media. His masterpieces were created from 1840 to 1850. He achieved an accomplished technique as a portraitist in this era and portraits of princes, the clergy and rich people were the main subjects of his works. 
Georgian-born Armenian film director Sergei Parajanov  made a short art film about him in 1967 entitled Hakob Hovnatanyan.

Moving to Iran 
He became interested in Persian art in his late-life which was new for him and people in the Caucasus. He moved to Iran because of the recession in Tiflis and to acquire new experiences. He went to his daughter's home who lived in Tabriz and after one year moved to Tehran and went to Naser al-Din Shah Qajar palace. Shortly after he was awarded a Courtesy title as an honorific scientific sign and also the name of Naghshbashi, which means master of painters. 
He stayed in Iran till his death in 1881 and he was buried in Saint George Church in Tehran

His masterpieces in Iran 
Among of his works done in Iran two works are considered remarkable. The portrait of Ali Ibn Abi Talib and the portrait of Naser al-Din Shah Qajar.

Legacy 
A crater on the planet Mercury is named after Hakob Hovnatanian.

Selected portraits

Sources 

 Biography @ Armeniapedia
 http://library.thinkquest.org/C003796/gather/hhovnatanian.html 

Ethnic Armenian artists
1806 births
1881 deaths
Emigrants from the Russian Empire to Iran
Persian Armenians
Iranian artists
Ethnic Armenian painters